The 2015 African Handball Champions League was the 37th edition, organized by the African Handball Confederation, under the auspices of the International Handball Federation, the handball sport governing body. The tournament was held from October 21–30, 2015 in three venues: Salle Al Aroui, Salle Omnisport and Salle Sellaouan, in Nador, Morocco, contested by 15 teams and won by Al Zamalek Cairo of Egypt.

Zamalek qualified to the 2016 IHF Super Globe.

Draw

Preliminary rounds 

Times given below are in WET UTC+0.

Group A

 Note:  Advance to quarter-finals Relegated to 5-8th classification Relegated to 9-12th classification

Group B

 Note:  Advance to quarter-finals Relegated to 5-8th classification Relegated to 9-12th classification

Group C

 Note:  Advance to quarter-finals Relegated to 5-8th classification Relegated to 9-12th classification

Group D

 Note:  Advance to quarter-finals Relegated to 5-8th classification Relegated to 9-12th classification

Knockout stage
Championship bracket

5-8th bracket

9-12th bracket

13-15th place

Final standings

Awards

See also 
2015 African Handball Cup Winners' Cup

References

External links 
 

African Champions League
African Handball Champions League
Africa Women's Handball Championship for Clubs Champions
Women's Handball Championship for Clubs Champions
International handball competitions hosted by Morocco